The 2004 U.S. Olympic gymnastics team trials were held from June 24 to 27, 2004, at the Arrowhead Pond of Anaheim (now known as the Honda Center) in Anaheim, California.

Venue 
The Arrowhead Pond of Anaheim is an indoor arena located in Anaheim, California. The arena is home to the Anaheim Ducks of the National Hockey League.

Participants 
The top 12 finishers at the 2004 U.S. National Gymnastics Championships automatically qualified to compete at the Olympic trials:

The following people were also invited to Olympic trials:

Broadcast 
NBC Sports broadcast all nights of competition at the trials.

Results

Final standings

Olympic team selection 
The top two finishers automatically qualified to the team.  For the women this was Courtney Kupets and Courtney McCool.  The rest of the team would be determined after a selection camp was held.  Invitees to this camp included: Mohini Bhardwaj, Annia Hatch, Terin Humphrey, Allyse Ishino, Carly Janiga, Carly Patterson, Tasha Schwikert, Liz Tricase, Hollie Vise, and Tabitha Yim. Additionally injury petitions from Nicole Harris, Chellsie Memmel, and Marcia Newby were also accepted.  At the conclusion of the selection camp Patterson, Bhardwaj, Hatch, and Humphrey were added to the team with Memmel, Schwikert, and Ishino selected as alternates.

For the men the top two finishers were Paul Hamm and Brett McClure.  Additionally Jason Gatson and Morgan Hamm were also named to the men's team immediately following the Olympic trials conclusion.  In July Guard Young and Blaine Wilson were added to the team with Stephen McCain and Raj Bhavsar selected as alternates.

References 

United States Olympic trials
gymnastics
2004 in sports in California
Gymnastics at the 2004 Summer Olympics